The 1959 Wightman Cup was the 31st edition of the annual women's team tennis competition between the United States and Great Britain. It was held in Edgeworth, Pennsylvania in the United States.

References

Wightman Cups by year
Wightman Cup, 1959
Wightman Cup
Wightman Cup
Wightman Cup
Wightman Cup